James Gaius Watt (born January 31, 1938) is a public servant who served as U.S. Secretary of the Interior from 1981 to 1983. He has been described as "anti-environmentalist", and was one of Ronald Reagan's most controversial cabinet appointments. Watt's pro-development views played an instrumental role in ending the Sagebrush Rebellion.

Early life and career
Watt was born in Lusk, Wyoming, the son of Lois Mae (née Williams) and William Gaius Watt.  He attended the University of Wyoming, earning a bachelor's degree in 1960 and a juris doctor degree in 1962. Watt's first political job was as an aide to Republican Party Senator Milward L. Simpson of Wyoming, whom he met through Simpson's son, Alan.

A lifelong Republican, he served as Secretary to the right-leaning Natural Resources Committee and Environmental Pollution Advisory Panel of the U.S. Chamber of Commerce. In 1969, Watt was appointed the deputy assistant secretary of water and power development at the Department of the Interior. In 1975, Watt was appointed vice chairman of the Federal Power Commission. In 1977, Watt became the first president and chief legal officer of Mountain States Legal Foundation, a public interest law firm "dedicated to individual liberty, the right to own and use property, limited and ethical government and economic freedom." A number of attorneys who worked for Watt at the firm later became high-ranking officers of the federal government, including Ann Veneman and Gale Norton.

Secretary of the Interior
In 1980, President-elect Reagan nominated Watt as his Secretary of the Interior. The United States Senate subsequently confirmed the nomination.

His tenure as Secretary of the Interior was controversial, primarily because he was perceived as being hostile to environmentalism, and endorsed development of federal lands by foresting and ranching, and for other commercial interests.

According to the Center for Biological Diversity, Watt had the record, among those who served as Secretary of the Interior, of listing the fewest species protected under the Endangered Species Act. The record was later surpassed by Dirk Kempthorne, a George W. Bush appointee who, as of August 27, 2007 , had not listed a single species in the 15-month period since his confirmation.

Greg Wetstone, the chief environment counsel at the House Energy and Commerce Committee during the Reagan administration, who subsequently served as director of advocacy at the Natural Resources Defense Council, argued that Watt was one of the two most "intensely controversial and blatantly anti-environmental political appointees" in American history. The other was Anne Gorsuch, director of the EPA at the time. Environmental groups accused Watt of reducing funding for environmental programs, restructuring the department to decrease federal regulatory power, wanting to eliminate the Land and Water Conservation Fund which aimed at increasing the area of wildlife refuges and other protected land, easing regulations of oil and mining, directing the National Park Service to draft rules that would de-authorize congressionally authorized national parks,  and recommending lease of wilderness and shore lands such as Santa Monica Bay to explore and develop oil and gas.

Watt resisted accepting donation of private land to be used for conservation. He suggested that 80 million acres (320,000 km²) of undeveloped land in the United States all be opened for drilling and mining by 2000. The area leased to coal mining quintupled during his term as Secretary of the Interior. Watt boasted that he leased "a billion acres" (4 million km²) of coastal waters, even though only a small portion of that area would ever be drilled.  Watt once stated, "We will mine more, drill more, cut more timber."

Watt periodically mentioned his Dispensationalist Christian faith when discussing his method of environmental management. Speaking before Congress, he once said, "I do not know how many future generations we can count on before the Lord returns, whatever it is we have to manage with a skill to leave the resources needed for future generations."

One apocryphal quotation falsely attributed to Watt is: "After the last tree is felled, Christ will come back." Glenn Scherer, writing for Grist magazine, erroneously attributed this remark to 1981 testimony by Watt before Congress. Journalist Bill Moyers, relying on the Grist article, also attributed the comment to Watt. After it was discovered that the alleged quotation did not exist, Grist corrected the error, and Moyers apologized. 

"I never said it. Never believed it. Never even thought it," Watt later wrote of the statement. "I know no Christian who believes or preaches such error. The Bible commands conservation — that we as Christians be careful stewards of the land and resources entrusted to us by the Creator."

Beach Boys concert
From 1980 through 1982, The Beach Boys and The Grass Roots separately performed at Independence Day concerts at the National Mall in Washington, D.C., attracting large crowds. In April 1983, Watt banned the concerts, on the grounds that "rock bands" who had performed on the Mall on Independence Day in 1981 and 1982 had encouraged drug use and alcoholism, and had attracted "the wrong element", who would subsequently rob attendees of similar events. Watt then announced that Las Vegas singer Wayne Newton, a friend and an endorser of President Reagan and a contributor to the Republican Party, would perform at the Independence Day celebration at the mall in 1983. During the ensuing controversy, Rob Grill, lead singer of The Grass Roots, stated that he felt "highly insulted" by Watt's remarks, which he termed "nothing but un-American."

The Beach Boys stated that the Soviet Union, which had invited them to perform in Leningrad in 1978, "obviously... did not feel the group attracted the wrong element." Vice President George H. W. Bush said of The Beach Boys, "They're my friends, and I like their music." Watt apologized to The Beach Boys after learning that President Reagan and First Lady Nancy Reagan were fans of the band. Nancy Reagan apologized for Watt. The White House staff gave Watt a plaster foot with a hole for his "having shot himself in the foot."

The Tonight Show host Johnny Carson poked fun at Watt's last name, saying, "James What? What?"

Other controversies
Mad magazine listed ten Watt controversies on the back cover of their October 1982 issue, under the title "Watt... We Worry!"; the list noted, among other quotes and actions, Watt's statement that "the Department of the Interior ... must be ... the Amicus for the minerals industry ... in Federal Policy."

In an interview with the Satellite Program Network, Watt said, "If you want an example of the failure of socialism, don't go to Russia, come to America and go to the Indian reservations."

Resignation
A controversy erupted after a speech to the U.S. Chamber of Commerce in September 1983, when Watt mocked affirmative action with his description of a department coal leasing panel: "I have a black, a woman, two Jews and a cripple. And we have talent."

Within three weeks of making this statement, on October 9, 1983, he announced his resignation at deputy undersecretary Thomas J. Barrack's ranch, near President Reagan's Rancho del Cielo.

Later life

Misdemeanor conviction
After leaving the Department of the Interior in 1983, Watt lobbied the Department of Housing and Urban Development. Ten years later, Watt was indicted on 18 counts of felony perjury and obstruction of justice and accused of making false statements before a federal grand jury investigating influence peddling at the Department of Housing and Urban Development at that time. On January 2, 1996, Watt pleaded guilty to one misdemeanor count of withholding documents. On March 12, 1996, he was sentenced to five years' probation, and ordered to pay a fine of $5,000 and perform 500 hours of community service.

Views on Bush 43 Presidency
In a 2001 interview with The Denver Post, Watt applauded the energy policy of the second Bush administration, stating that it was just what he recommended in the early 1980s: "You've got to have more oil, you've got to have more coal, you've got to have more of everything," Watt said. "You've got to have more conservation too, but … solar energy and wind energy — they're just teeny infant portions [of energy]. You're not going to run the world with solar energy by the year 2001, or 2002, or 2010."

References

External links

 Wolf, Ron. 1981. God, James Watt, and the Public Land. Audubon 83(3):65
 Time magazine article (August 23, 1982). "Going, Going...! Land sale of the century"
 James G. Watt papers at the University of Wyoming – American Heritage Center

|-

1938 births
20th-century American politicians
Carter administration personnel
Federal Power Commission
Ford administration personnel
Living people
People from Lusk, Wyoming
Reagan administration cabinet members
Reagan administration controversies
United States Secretaries of the Interior
University of Wyoming College of Law alumni
Wyoming politicians convicted of crimes
Wyoming Republicans